Abner Pratt (May 22, 1801 – March 27, 1863) was an American lawyer, politician, diplomat, and jurist.

Born in Springfield, Otsego County, New York, Pratt studied law and was admitted to the New York bar. Pratt served as district attorney in Rochester, New York. In 1839, Pratt moved to Marshall, Michigan and continued to practice law. In 1844 and 1845, Pratt served in the Michigan State Senate. From 1850 until 1857, Pratt served on the Michigan Supreme Court and served as chief justice of the court. In 1857, President James Buchanan appointed Pratt consul to the Kingdom of Hawaii serving until 1862. Pratt returned to Marshall, Michigan and built his home Honolulu House. In 1863, Pratt served in the Michigan House of Representatives and served as mayor of Marshall, Michigan. Pratt died in Marshall, Michigan in 1863.

Notes

External links
Marshall, Michigan-Honolulu House

1801 births
1863 deaths
People from Springfield, New York
People from Marshall, Michigan
Michigan lawyers
New York (state) lawyers
American consuls
19th-century American diplomats
Mayors of places in Michigan
Chief Justices of the Michigan Supreme Court
Michigan state senators
Members of the Michigan House of Representatives
19th-century American politicians
19th-century American judges
19th-century American lawyers
Justices of the Michigan Supreme Court